West Germany (Federal Republic of Germany) competed at the 1968 Winter Olympics in Grenoble.  West German athletes had competed together with East German athletes as the United Team of Germany in the previous three Winter Olympic Games, but both nations sent independent teams starting in 1968.

Medalists

Alpine skiing

Men

Men's slalom

Women

Biathlon

Men

1One minute added per close miss (a hit in the outer ring), two minutes added per complete miss.

Men's 4 x 7.5 km relay

2A penalty loop of 200 metres had to be skied per missed target.

Bobsleigh

Cross-country skiing

Men

Men's 4 × 10 km relay

Women

Women's 3 x 5 km relay

Figure skating

Men

Women

Pairs

Ice hockey

First round

  West Germany -  Romania  7:0 (1:0, 3:0, 3:0) 
Goalscorers: Gustav Hanig 2, Alois Schloder, Ernst Kopf, Otto Schneitberger, Horst Meindl, Heinz Weisenbach.

Final Round 

	
 Canada –  West Germany 	6:1  (0:0, 4:1, 2:0)
Goalscorers: Bourbonnais 2, Cadieux, Dineen, Mott, Huck – Kopf.
Referees: Seglin, Snětkov (URS)

	
 Czechoslovakia –  West Germany 	5:1  (1:0, 2:0, 2:1)
Goalscorers: Hrbatý, Golonka, Havel, Hejma, Ševčík – Lax.	
Referees: Kubinec, McEvoy (CAN)	

  Sweden –  West Germany	5:4  (4:3, 0:0, 1:1)
Goalscorers: Svedberg, Lundström, Nordlander, Olsson, Öberg – Kuhn, Hanig, Reif, Kopf. 	
Referees: Kořínek, Bucala (TCH)

	
 USSR –  West Germany 	9:1  (4:1, 4:0, 1:0)
Goalscorers: Populanov 2, Alexandrov 2, Ionov, Staršinov, Majorov, Mojsejev, Firsov – Funk.	
Referees: Trumble (USA), Valentin (AUT)

	
 USA –  West Germany 	8:1  (2:1, 4:0, 2:0)
Goalscorers: Volmar 2, Ross, Morrison, Nanne, Pleau, Cunnoff, P. Hurley – Funk.
Referees: McEvoy (CAN), Seglin (URS)	

	
 Finland–  West Germany 	4:1  (2:1, 1:0, 1:0)
Goalscorers: Leimu 2, Ketola, J. Peltonen – Schloder.
Referees: Kořínek, Bucala (TCH)	

	
 East Germany –  West Germany	2:4  (0:1, 1:2, 1:1)
Goalscorers: Hiller, Fuchs – Funk, Waitl, Hanig, Lax.
Referees: McEvoy (CAN), Kořínek (TCH)

Contestants
7. WEST GERMANY
Goaltenders: Josef Schramm, Günther Knauss.
Defence: Leonhard Eaitl, Johannes Schichtl, Rudolf Thanner, Otto Schneitberger, Josef Völk, Heinz Bader. 
Forwards: Josef Reif, Ernst Köpf, Bernd Kuhn, Lorenz Funk, Alois Schloder, Gustav Hanig, Horst Meindl, Heinz Weisenbach, Manfred Gmeiner, Peter Lax. 
Coach: Ed Riegle.

Luge

Men

(Men's) Doubles

Women

Nordic combined 

Events:
 normal hill ski jumping (Three jumps, best two counted and shown here.)
 15 km cross-country skiing

Ski jumping

Speed skating

Men

Women

References
Official Olympic Reports
International Olympic Committee results database
 Olympic Winter Games 1968, full results by sports-reference.com

Germany, West
1968
Winter Olympics